The oil and gas industry is usually divided into three major sectors: upstream, midstream, and downstream. The downstream sector is the refining of petroleum crude oil and the processing and purifying of raw natural gas, as well as the marketing and distribution of products derived from crude oil and natural gas. The downstream sector reaches consumers through products such as gasoline or petrol, kerosene, jet fuel, diesel oil, heating oil, fuel oils, lubricants, waxes, asphalt, natural gas, and liquefied petroleum gas (LPG) as well as naphtha and hundreds of petrochemicals.

Midstream operations are often included in the downstream category and are considered to be a part of the downstream sector.

Byproduct sulfur
Crude oil is a mixture of many varieties of hydrocarbons and most usually have many sulfur-containing compounds. The oil refining process commonly includes hydrodesulfurization which converts most of that sulfur into gaseous hydrogen sulfide. Raw natural gas also may contain gaseous hydrogen sulfide and sulfur-containing mercaptans, which are removed in natural-gas processing plants before the gas is distributed to consumers.

The hydrogen sulfide removed in the refining and processing of crude oil and natural gas is subsequently converted into byproduct elemental sulfur. In fact, the vast majority of the 64,000,000 metric tons of sulfur produced worldwide in 2005 was byproduct sulfur from refineries and natural-gas processing plants.

Downstream in ISO
ISO 20815 defines "downstream" in its definition section as:
3.1.8 downstream
business process, most commonly in petroleum industry, associated with post-production activities.
Example: refining, transportation and marketing of petroleum products.

See also

Coalbed methane
Extraction of petroleum
Hydrocarbon exploration
Midstream
Natural gas
Natural-gas condensate
Natural gas field

Natural-gas processing
Petroleum
Oil production plant
Oil refinery
Oil well
Upstream (petroleum industry)

References

Chemical process engineering
Natural gas
Oil refining
Petroleum industry
Petroleum production